The 1984–85 LEN European Cup was the 22nd edition of LEN's premier competition for men's water polo clubs.

Group stage

Group A

Group B

Semi-finals

Finals

See also
1984–85 LEN Cup Winners' Cup

LEN Champions League seasons
1984 in water polo
1985 in water polo